Eliya X ( / Elīyā, d. 14 December 1722) was Patriarch of the Church of the East from 1700 to 1722, with residence in Rabban Hormizd Monastery, near Alqosh, in modern Iraq. During his tenure, traditional ties of the Patriarchate with the remaining Christian community of the East Syriac Rite in India were re-established, and in 1708 bishop Mar Gabriel (d.  1733) was sent there by the Patriarch, succeeding upon arrival to the Malabar Coast to revive the local East Syriac Christian community.

In older historiography, he was designated as Eliya X, but later renumbered as Eliya "XI" by some authors. After the resolution of several chronological questions, he was designated again as Eliya X, and that numeration is accepted in recent scholarly works.

See also
 Patriarch of the Church of the East
 List of Patriarchs of the Church of the East
 Assyrian Church of the East

Notes

References

External links 

Patriarchs of the Church of the East
18th-century bishops of the Church of the East
1722 deaths
Year of birth missing
18th-century archbishops
Assyrians from the Ottoman Empire
Bishops in the Ottoman Empire
18th-century people from the Ottoman Empire